Mehluli Don Ayanda Sibanda (born 6 November 1999) is a Zimbabwean tennis player.

Sibanda has a career high ATP singles ranking of 861 achieved on 21 October 2019.

Sibanda has represented Zimbabwe at the Davis Cup, where he has a win-loss record of 0–2.

ATP Challenger and ITF Futures finals

Singles: 1 (0–1)

Doubles 1 (0–1)

References

External links

1999 births
Living people
Zimbabwean male tennis players
Competitors at the 2019 African Games
African Games competitors for Zimbabwe